''Doctor Who in Australia refers to the history and culture surrounding the British Broadcasting Corporation science fiction programme Doctor Who since its first broadcast in Australia in January 1965.

From its origins Australians have had many links to Doctor Who: two Australian writers played key roles in the series' gestation – C.E. "Bunny" Webber and Anthony Coburn, Coburn having worked on the pre-production and first story; the iconic Doctor Who theme music was written by Australian musician Ron Grainer; one-time Australian ballet composer Dudley Simpson wrote incidental music for many stories during the 1960s and 1970s; and the actress Janet Fielding played popular companion Tegan in the 1980s.

Additionally, the Australian Broadcasting Commission (ABC) was one of the first and longest term purchasers of the series from the BBC, initially planning its Australian debut for May 1964, only six months after the UK premiere.

In 1979 the ABC organised a nationwide promotional tour by then-current Doctor Tom Baker and, in 1983, it co-funded the 20th anniversary special The Five Doctors.

Australia was also a key market for the many products licensed by BBC Enterprises and the success of the series in Australia was an important factor in its worldwide penetration; English-speaking countries in the Asia-Pacific region generally bought whatever episodes the ABC had cleared for its own use, and BBC Enterprises' office for the entire region was in Sydney and dealt with the censors and marketing.

Broadcast history
Doctor Who was first purchased from the BBC by the then Australian Broadcasting Commission – now the Australian Broadcasting Corporation (ABC) – in March 1964 and initially planned for premiere in May. However the Australian Film Censorship Board (AFCB) classified the series' first thirteen episodes 'A', meaning they were only suitable for a young adult audience, thus preventing the ABC from showing the series in the 6:30pm Sunday timeslot they had intended to use.

As a result, the show's Australian debut was held over until January 1965 and, thereafter, it became an important part of the ABC's schedule. This included both prime time first-run episodes, as well as repeats of some or all of the most recent serials during both prime time and school holidays, meaning Australian viewers had more opportunities to see the series than viewers in Britain, where repeats were extremely uncommon at the time.

The 1960s
Doctor Who was first broadcast in Australia by the ABC's Perth station, ABW-2, on Tuesday 12 January 1965. Individual episodes were sent to Australia by the BBC in the form of one 16mm black and white film print. If simultaneous broadcast was required (i.e. the same episode scheduled in two different cities on the same date) the ABC had to make copies and send them to the relevant stations for local transmission (until the late 1960s the national broadcaster was not networked and regional variations – both between metropolitan areas as well as between metropolitan and non-metropolitan areas – remained commonplace until as late as the mid-1980s).

However, for much of Doctor Who's first decade on Australian television, each episode's film or video print was physically transported from city to city, for broadcast in each on a different date and generally according to an entirely different schedule. For example, after being screened in Perth on Tuesday 12 January 1965, the first episode An Unearthly Child was screened by ABN-2 Sydney on Friday 15 January, then by ABQ-2 Brisbane on Friday 22 January, by ABV-2 Melbourne on Saturday 20 February and by ABS-2 Adelaide on Monday 15 March. As a result, different broadcast regions saw different episodes on different days, sometimes weeks or even months after the same episode had been screened elsewhere in the country. Later improvements in the capacity of cable or microwave and other links enabled the ABC to broadcast on an increasingly national basis, although even into the 1970s the debut screenings of some episodes were still weeks apart from one city to the next.

Episodes continued to be broadcast weekly until mid-1966, generally in the same timeslot for each city that the programme had debuted in the previous year. By the time the last weekly episode was broadcast in June 1966 – episode 4 of The Crusade – first-run ABC episodes were still only around twelve months behind their original BBC transmission dates.

3 October 1966 marked the first time the ABC stripped Doctor Who in the 6:30 Monday–Thursday timeslot, with the first episode of The Space Museum in NSW/ACT, The Chase in Victoria, and The Time Meddler in Queensland.  On 24 March 1967 screenings reverted to one episode per week for some years, with repeats being screened in school holidays in the early afternoon, a practice that commenced in NSW on 20 December 1965. In May 1969 the practice became commonplace across all Australian states and episodes were repeated throughout most school holiday periods (though with differing schedules between cities) until 17 May 1974, after which no further school holiday repeats were scheduled.Broadwcast: Australian Transmission History (Part Three) (1971-1975)

Doctor Who's first regeneration, from William Hartnell's First Doctor to Patrick Troughton's Second Doctor, was first screened in Australian on ABS-2 Adelaide and ABW-2 Perth on Friday 14 July 1967, then elsewhere during July and September.unpublished personal contemporary records, research of contemporary TV listings. From mid-1969 into the 1970s the ABC returned Doctor Who to a mostly weekly schedule, typically in an early-evening Friday timeslot or late-afternoon on Sundays. Between series of Doctor Who shows from similar genre were typically shown, including Timeslip (1972–73), Phoenix Five (1970)Classic Australian TV Chronology and Frank and Francesca (1973).

On the 6 May 1974 the ABC started regularly screening episodes in a weekday early-evening timeslot but with differing stories in various regions before reverting to weekly screenings. It was not until 7 Feb 1978 that the same schedule was broadcast simultaneously across the entire nation that weekday screening became the common practice.

The 1970s
With repeats regularly scheduled during school holidays until May 1974, as well as first-run episodes being screened at the same time, there was sometimes as many as eleven episodes of Doctor Who screened in any given week. But within only a few years, the number of episodes being lavished on fans decreased dramatically.

By the beginning of the 1970s, the gap between UK and Australian premieres of Doctor Who had extended to twenty-one months. Individual episodes were still being shipped from one city to another for local transmission and ABC schedules were also still decided, at least to a limited extent, at a local level. Throughout April and May 1970 the ABC's first Doctor Who debut of the decade was The Dominators, first shown on BBC1 in August 1968. By the time the first episode to feature Jon Pertwee's Third Doctor premiered around the country during July and August 1971, the UK/Australia gap had been marginally reduced to eighteen months.

The BBC's switch to colour for Pertwee's first season in 1970 could not be reflected in Australia, where colour broadcasting was experimenting in 1972–1974 but did not commence final transmission until March 1975. Nearly all of the Pertwee era was first screened in Australia in black and white, with his final season the first to premiere in colour around the country at various times between 1975 and 1977. (Stories from Pertwee's first four seasons were not broadcast in colour for the first time until the ABC purchased additional repeat rights to numerous blocks of those serials between 1978 and 1986).

After having aired more-or-less continuously for nine years, 1974 saw a dramatic ongoing change in the ABC's scheduling of Doctor Who. The last twelve first-run episodes of Season 9 were broadcast weekly between January and March, followed by Monday–Friday repeats of the same season from September/October until December/January. For several years in the mid-1970s there followed a haphazard scheduling of Doctor Who, with seasons either broken up or only partially screened due to serials being omitted, as well as last-minute or unannounced cancellations of scheduled broadcasts that were occasionally countered by equally abrupt and unannounced "surprise" broadcasts if, for example, a sporting event was cancelled due to bad weather.

One of the results of this combination of factors was that the Australian premiere of first-run episodes – which, by 1975, was still a year behind BBC1 – began to again drift further and further behind the UK. In Sydney in 1975, the ABC screened just fourteen weekly instalments of Doctor Who – The Time Warrior, Death to the Daleks and The Monster of Peladon – between March and June. These were the first episodes to be broadcast by the ABC in colour. (Due to the BBC's accidental wiping of the master tape of Invasion of the Dinosaurs''' first episode, that story was not screened at all by the ABC until November 1984, when they simply broadcast it – without any preceding explanation – as a five-part story, starting from episode 2. They never actually broadcast the full six episode story until 2004).

In 1976 Doctor Who fans in Sydney, Melbourne and Brisbane fared only marginally better than they had in 1975, with sixteen weekly instalments broadcast, starting with Planet of the Spiders at various times between March and May, followed by Tom Baker's debut in Robot, then The Sontaran Experiment and The Ark in Space (in that incorrect order). At about the same time the ABC announced its decision not to buy any further new episodes of Doctor Who. The announcement generated uproar among fans, who went on to stage an ongoing series of protests in an attempt to save the show (see below); in doing so, the first seeds of Australian Doctor Who fandom were effectively sown.

Despite the earlier announcement, 1977 was again a marginally better year than the one before. There were nineteen weekly episodes broadcast, commencing in May with the significantly delayed first runs of Season 12's Genesis of the Daleks and Revenge of the Cybermen (more than two years after their first UK broadcast), before repeating The Time Warrior and Death to the Daleks from the previous season.

With a new Controller of Television, James Fitzmaurice, the ABC reversed its decision on Doctor Who towards the end of 1977 and from early 1978 the show was again a regular fixture within the ABC's early-evening weeknight schedules. Typically it was stripped Monday-Thursday at 6:30pm, though there were some variations to this as well as some exceptions to what was actually screened (e.g. The Brain of Morbius – see below).

Baker's second and third seasons marked a major up-turn in the show's popularity around the world and the ABC renewed repeat rights to many colour episodes from the Pertwee era, including ones that had previously been blocked from early-evening broadcast due to originally having been classified 'A' by the Australian Film Censorship Board (AFCB). (These episodes were reviewed again by the Board which, by this time, felt that they were suitable for general broadcast). In a sequence that the ABC would repeat several times over the following four years, new Baker episodes would be shown, followed by a rerun of selected colour episodes from Pertwee's Spearhead from Space onwards.

In 1979 the ABC brought Baker to Australia for a nationwide promotional campaign and media blitz. He later made a second visit (this time only to Sydney) to popularise the new line of merchandise centred on his characterisation of the Doctor (posters, buttons, etc.).

The 1980s
The period from 1978 through to the mid-1980s saw the ABC continue to strip Doctor Who in an early-evening weekday timeslot; typically it was Monday-Thursday or Monday–Friday, at either 6:00 or 6:30 pm. It would almost always screen throughout the year and, more often than not, it was paired with another program at 6:00: most notably The Goodies;"(Peter Russell-Clarke's) ABC show that ran between The Goodies and Doctor Who throughout the 1980s" – That was then, this is now, Sydney Morning Herald, 28 February 2010 but also others such as The Ghost & Mrs. Muir, Spike Milligan's Q or ABC productions such as Home or Sweet & Sour. Doctor Who would usually be followed by a single music video clip or some other suitably short program to fill the remaining five minutes before the 7pm news (Doctor Who episodes were generally 25 minutes long at the time). However, in early 1981 those who were eagerly awaiting the return of Doctor Who after the summer non-ratings period were dismayed to find an unknown Japanese fantasy series called Monkey screening in what had become the traditional timeslot for The Goodies & Doctor Who. Following increasing complaints about the volume of Doctor Who repeats, the ABC took the decision not to screen the show at all during 1981.

Early 1981 also saw the departure of the longest running Doctor, Tom Baker. Having caught up from the 1981 hiatus by screening all of Baker's final season four nights a week during March and April 1982, the ABC continued screening the series almost as soon as it had been shown by the BBC. The ABC screened Peter Davison's debut in Castrovalva at the end of April, just three months after its UK debut. For Doctor Whos 20th anniversary in 1983 the ABC provided some production funding for the special 90-minute anniversary story, The Five Doctors, and made a greater-than-usual promotional effort, screening it just 18 days after its UK broadcast. (The nationwide visit by Peter Davison earlier in 1983 had been organised by a department store chain!).

The launch of satellite technology in the mid-1980s enabled the ABC to begin broadcasting on a truly national scale and from around 1986 there were rarely differences in capital city schedules, though regional variations remained as the ABC's charter as a public broadcaster meant that it had to fulfill that function more often in regional areas with only one other television station (as was the case with all of regional Australia until around 1989). As such, where precedence was occasionally given to local events (sport, elections, etc.), programs like Doctor Who would sometimes find themselves moved to a different timeslot, if not bumped from the schedule altogether.

The pattern of new episodes and repeats continued, with more-or-less uninterrupted broadcast of Doctor Who throughout the ratings periods of 1982, 1983 and 1984, including numerous black and white Pertwee serials unscreened for ten years. In 1985 Doctor Who did not return to the ABC until the premiere of Colin Baker's first full season in early December. On its original UK broadcast, Season 22 featured a change in format to 45-minute episodes. However, to fit with established scheduling here in Australia, the ABC cut each 45-minute episode in half, resulting in two roughly 23½ minute episodes and meaning a particularly poor 'non-cliffhanger' was created at around the halfway mark of each of the original episodes.

After part four of Revelation of the Daleks in late January 1986, fans were surprised by the broadcast of two black and white Troughton serials (The Mind Robber and The Krotons), screened by the ABC for the first time since 1971. Nearly all Pertwee episodes that only existed in black and white were also screened along with the rest of the Pertwee era in 1986, though again with the exception of part one of Invasion of the Dinosaurs. (A full run of all available black and white serials did not happen until the ABC celebrated the show's 40th anniversary in 2003, though at that time some Dalek stories were omitted due to an ongoing dispute between the BBC and Terry Nation's estate).

The fourteen-episode season-long epic that would become Colin Baker's swansong, The Trial of a Time Lord, finally debuted on the ABC in February 1987, five months after its UK debut and just over two months since news of Baker's dismissal from the role was made public. Where the ABC had played around with the previous season's 45-minute format by splitting the episodes in half, with Season 23 they moved the show to an early Saturday evening slot and edited two 25-minute episodes together. So the fourteen episodes took only seven weeks to get through and once the marathon tale was finished the ABC retained the timeslot to continue, in the same two edited episode format, from where they'd left off at the end of 1986 with Tom Baker repeats. In September 1987 the program was moved to 1pm Saturdays, sticking with the two episode format for another six weeks. Starting from Image of the Fendahl (metro) / The Invisible Enemy (regional), whole story omnibus editions were broadcast, with all their episodes edited together to form one long feature-length presentation. This format was retained, with only minor variations to the timeslot, until The Caves of Androzani on Saturday 2 July 1988.

On 31 October 1988, stripped weekday transmissions of new episodes of Doctor Who recommenced, with the show now in the 5:30pm timeslot and broadcast under the umbrella of the children's magazine-style program The Afternoon Show, starting with Sylvester McCoy's debut in Time and the Rani almost fourteen months after it first screened on BBC1. (This extended delay in broadcasting was repeated for Doctor Who's final two seasons as well). After Season 24 finished, as a gesture to fans in recognition of Doctor Who's 25th anniversary, the ABC also screened the first story of Season 25, Remembrance of the Daleks, only a little more a month since its UK debut.

Throughout 1989 Doctor Who continued as part of The Afternoon Show, first with a series of Tom Baker repeats from Robot to The Brain of Morbius during February and March, then The Seeds of Doom through to The Invisible Enemy during June, July and August. A repeat of Season 24 and Remembrance of the Daleks commenced in late-October, with the first-run The Greatest Show in the Galaxy debuting on 17 November, eleven months after the UK. Broadcast completely out of UK transmission order, the season ended with part three of The Happiness Patrol in early December.

Throughout the 1960s and 1970s, numerous stories either were not broadcast alongside the other serials from their respective seasons, or had not been purchased at all. Aside from Invasion of the Dinosaurs (see earlier reference), almost all of these serials were omitted because they'd been reviewed by the Australian Film Censorship Board (AFCB) and classified as not suitable for general viewing, which meant they could not be screened before 8:30 pm without having scenes of violence or horror edited down or removed entirely; even after being edited, many still could not be shown any earlier than 7:30 pm. Due to the BBC's junking policy during the 1970s, which saw the master copies of hundreds of early Doctor Who episodes destroyed, the majority of unscreened 1960s serials were never broadcast in Australia. Almost all of the 1970s serials were subsequently reviewed again by the Board and re-classified as being suitable for a general audience, but by 1980 one of them – The Brain of Morbius – was still classified as suitable only for adults; even after it was reviewed a second time by the AFCB for in 1978, it was still deemed to be too dark and violent for children. Eventually a heavily censored 60-minute omnibus edition of the story debuted on ABS-2 Adelaide at 8:30 pm in October 1978. It was later broadcast in all other capital cities in the same timeslot in January 1980. By 1986 it had been reconstructed as a four-part story, but the previous censor cuts remained. The ABC did not play an uncensored version of Morbius until the show was being broadcast at 4:30 am weekdays during 1993.

The 1990s: 1990–94Doctor Who returned to the ABC in April 1990 with another six weeks of Tom Baker repeats, picking up from where they had left off in 1989 with The Invisible Enemy. The show was again stripped Monday-Friday at 5:30pm as part of The Afternoon Show. Another six-week block of Baker repeats commenced in early-July, followed by a return to Sylvester McCoy serials for four weeks from mid-October; this block commenced with a repeat of the last three stories of Season 25, followed by the first-run of all four Season 26 serials, finishing with Part Three of Survival on 16 November 1990. This was the last 'classic' series episode to debut on the ABC (aside from the first episode of Invasion of the Dinosaurs – see below).

Nearly a year later, Tom Baker repeats recommenced. The nine-week block ended with the final episode of Logopolis on 3 January 1992. It was the last time that Doctor Who was screened as part of The Afternoon Show.

On 8 March 1993 Doctor Who returned to the ABC schedule, this time at 4:30am Monday-Friday. Again picking up from where the last block had left off, this run commenced with Castrovalva and continued virtually uninterrupted until almost exactly one year later. Over the course of that year, all Fifth Doctor serials except The Five Doctors were screened, followed by the first seven Sixth Doctor serials up to Revelation of the Daleks. Another run of Tom Baker episodes started in July, from The Ark in Space and cycling through twenty serials – mostly in original UK transmission order – before reverting to Revenge of the Cybermen in November (it had not been screened in July).

To commemorate Doctor Who's 30th anniversary, the ABC showed all four episodes of An Unearthly Child at 6:00 pm from Monday 22 – Thursday 25 November 1993. Its final episode, The Firemaker, marked the last time the ABC screened Doctor Who in an early-evening weekday slot until commemorating its 40th anniversary ten years later.

Meanwhile, in the first week of December 1993 the early-morning schedule reverted to another run of Davison serials from Black Orchid through to The Caves of Androzani, again followed by the first seven Colin Baker serials. Between 1 February and 1 March 1994 the schedule changed to two back-to-back episodes per day, at 4:10 am and 4:35 am apart from Fridays when only one episode was shown at 4:35 am. The four-part episodic version of The Five Doctors was not shown, but the four episode edit of Resurrection of the Daleks was, as were the Australian 23½ minute episodes of Colin Baker's Season 22 stories. On 4 March 1994, Part Four of Revelation of the Daleks became the last episode from the 'classic' series of Doctor Who to be screened by the ABC until their 40th anniversary commemoration in September 2003.

1996: The Telemovie
The first attempt to revive Doctor Who was with a made-for-TV movie, filmed in Canada and financed and produced in the US for the FOX network, in 1996. It featured Sylvester McCoy in his final portrayal of the Seventh Doctor and introduced Paul McGann as the Eighth Doctor.

The ABC premiere of the movie was on Sunday 7 July at 8.30pm, nearly two months after its Canadian and US debut and almost six weeks after its first airing in the UK. The ABC had originally planned a 3 July airdate, but did not want to clash with The X-Files, which was already established in the 8:30pm Wednesday timeslot and was achieving its peak success in Australia at the time.

Material in the movie was cut in the US to allow for extra advertising time, but these cuts were largely restored for the ABC's Australian broadcast. A publicity screening of the cut version had been held on 5 June at Planet Hollywood in Sydney, with several fan-built Daleks operated by fan club members acting as ushers.

During the summer non-ratings period of 1996–97, the ABC repeated the movie at 8:30pm on Wednesday 15 January. In recognition of Doctor Who's 35th anniversary they also replayed it a second time, at 11pm on Wednesday 25 November 1998.

The 1990s: 1996–99
Less than a month after the ABC premiere of the Doctor Who telemovie, the coming of subscription television to Australia saw the commencement of one of Doctor Who's longest uninterrupted runs. Foxtel's UKTV channel started screening the show from 1 August 1996; beginning with An Unearthly Child and airing weeknights at 11:30pm (plus weekend omnibus encores on Saturdays and Sundays), every available episode of the series was shown. The run ended more than two years later with the then most recent production, Doctor Who, on 16 August 1998.

After a break of only six weeks, another long run commenced in early-October 1998, starting from The Edge of Destruction and continuing through a selection of stories screened in a largely random order, although some were loosely grouped together on the basis of villains, locations or other themes. This run also included the results of UKTV's first viewer survey, with the ten stories voted most popular filling the last two months of the schedule, ending with The Five Doctors in November 1999. As well, this run featured the first Australian broadcast of the 1992 documentary Resistance is Useless, as well as More Than... Thirty Years in the TARDIS, the 1994 expanded version of the BBC's 30th anniversary documentary Doctor Who: Thirty Years in the TARDIS. Neither Resistance Is Useless nor either of the Thirty Years... productions had ever previously been shown on Australian television.

The 2000s
From 13 January 2000 the scheduling of Doctor Who on Foxtel's UKTV continued unabated. Returning to 11:30pm MondayFriday and again starting from the beginning, with very few exceptions virtually every episode screened in the previous run were shown again. On 17 June 2002, as with the 19961998 run of episodes this one also ended with the 1996 Doctor Who telemovie.

In October 2003 UKTV recommenced screening Doctor Who with its 40th Anniversary "Best Of" Selection. The selection included twelve stories: An Unearthly Child, The War Games, The Three Doctors, The Green Death, The Deadly Assassin, Logopolis, The Five Doctors, The Caves of Androzani, The Two Doctors, The Ultimate Foe, Survival and the 1996 telemovie. Omnibus editions of each were shown, with two stories screened from 8am until midday each Saturday between 11 October and 22 November. UKTV also presented a 40th Anniversary "Special Surprise" at 8:30pm on Sunday 23 November 2003. This was the last time that UKTV screened an episode of the 'classic' series.

2003–2006
In commemoration of Doctor Who's 40th anniversary, between September 2003 and February 2006 the ABC repeated the majority of the 'classic' series. The majority of available complete stories were screened true to their original UK transmission order at 6:05 pm Monday-Thursday. From November 2005 two episodes per night were screened, at 6:05pm and 6:30pm. Throughout the entire run, each episode was preceded by a 10-second animated title card featuring retro music, 60s-style shapes and colours and the words Back to the Future.

Part One of Invasion of the Dinosaurs finally had its ABC premiere in September 2004; it was the first time the ABC had ever shown all six episodes of the story together, more than thirty years after it was made and nearly twenty years after the ABC first screened it as a five-part serial. Numerous surviving serials were omitted due to a dispute between the BBC and the Estate of the late Terry Nation over the rights to the Daleks. Serials omitted due to this dispute were the Dalek stories Day..., Planet..., Destiny..., Resurrection..., Revelation... and Remembrance of the Daleks and Frontier in Space.  The War Games, Patrick Troughton's ten episode finale which features a Dalek for only a few seconds, was also skipped, while The Five Doctors – shown by the ABC in four-part episodic format for the first time – had its Dalek scenes edited out.

One episode from Inferno, Invasion of the Dinosaurs, The Stones of Blood and The Trial of a Time Lord were shown as early edits which differed from the BBC's final broadcast versions, while some of the 1960s episodes, The Dominators etc., were cut to reduce violence (Presumably due to them being the same edited prints by the ABC from the 1960s. The run ended with Part Three of Survival on 3 February 2006. As at July 2014, this remains the last time an episode of 'classic' Doctor Who was screened on the ABC.

 2005: The revival of Doctor Who 
When the BBC revived Doctor Who in 2005 with Christopher Eccleston as the Doctor and with Russell T. Davies as producer, the ABC responded by scheduling the series in the prime-time 7:30pm Saturday slot. Following the UK broadcast by less than two months, Series 1 of the new Doctor Who premiered in Australia with the first episode, Rose, on 21 May 2005, going on to win its timeslot in four out of five capital cities.

Series 1 of Doctor Who also saw the inception of the Doctor Who Christmas Special. The concept of a Christmas Special episode derived of an otherwise ongoing series has been commonplace in UK television for decades. However, the classic series of Doctor Who only ever featured one episode with any purposeful Christmas-related content: episode 7 of The Daleks' Master Plan was broadcast by the BBC on Christmas Day 1965 and featured The First Doctor William Hartnell offering viewers seasons' greetings direct-to-camera. For the first three series of the revived Doctor Who, the Christmas Special was held over by the ABC to be broadcast a week ahead of the next series, commencing with The Christmas Invasion which the ABC used to kick off Series 2 in Australia on Saturday 8 July 2006 – about ten hours before Series 2 finished in the UK.

Following the ABC's premiere of The Runaway Bride at 8:35pm on Thursday 28 June 2007, Series 3 was again broadcast in the 7:30pm Saturday slot from 30 June. This was the last first-run broadcast of Doctor Who on the ABC before the network was re-branded, in February 2008, as a multi-channel free-to-air and digital concern. Within weeks of the re-branding, a repeat of Series 1 commenced at 8:30pm Fridays on ABC2.

Series 4 saw the series moved to 7:30pm Sundays on ABC1, commencing on Sunday 29 June 2008 with Voyage of the Damned, followed by the rest of Series 4 on subsequent Sunday nights. For the first – and, subsequently, the only – time, the ABC achieved audiences in excess of 1 million viewers for every episode of the series. ABC1 also began screening Doctor Who Confidential (in cut-down form) in 2008, immediately following each week's episode.

On Sunday 25 January 2009 The Next Doctor had its Australian debut, only a month after its UK Christmas Day broadcast. Two days later, a repeat run of Series 2 and Series 3 (including Confidential Cutdown) commenced on ABC1 in the 8:30pm Tuesday slot. Following The Idiot's Lantern on 17 March, the run was interrupted for nearly sixteen weeks, before recommencing on ABC2 on Mondays at 9:30pm from 6 July. The run continued weekly, without further interruption or scheduling changes, until Journey's End on 22 February 2010. Seven weeks after its UK Easter broadcast, Planet of the Dead premiered on ABC1 on Sunday 31 May while The Waters of Mars, the third of four specials that made up David Tennant's final series as The Doctor, debuted on ABC1 on Sunday 6 December, just three weeks after UK broadcast. The final two episodes of the Tennant era, "The End of Time" (broadcast on Christmas Day and New Year's Day in the UK) aired on ABC1 at 7:30pm Sundays on 14 and 21 February.

In 2010 the gap between UK and Australian broadcasts was reduced to just two weeks. ABC1 aired the first episode of Series 5, The Eleventh Hour starring Matt Smith in his first full story as The Eleventh Doctor, at 7:30pm on Sunday 18 April. Each episode of the series could also be viewed on the ABC's iView website two days prior to the television airdate. In an unprecedented move, the 2010 Christmas Special A Christmas Carol aired on ABC1 at 7:30pm Boxing Day, only around 12 hours after it had finished in the UK. In 45 years of broadcasting Doctor Who this was the shortest delay between UK and Australian transmission. Earlier that day ABC1 had also screened Doctor Who at the Proms. From the following week, commencing with "The End of Time" Part 1, they repeated David Tennant's finale followed by Series 5 in various timeslots close to 5:30pm, ending with The Big Bang on 24 April.

By 2011 the UK/Australia gap was down to just one week, with the first half of Series 6 going out on ABC1 at 7:30pm from Saturday 30 April, just one week after its BBC One debut. The pattern continued with the second half of the series, airing just a week after the UK from Saturday 3 September from Let's Kill Hitler. Between June and September ABC1 also scheduled a repeat of Series 4 in numerous late-night Saturday slots varying between 10:15pm and 12:55am. On Boxing Day, ABC1 again broadcast the Doctor Who Christmas special within about twelve hours of its UK broadcast, giving The Doctor, the Widow and the Wardrobe its Australian debut at 7:30pm. In late-night slots across the Christmas weekend ABC1 had repeated The Next Doctor on 24 December, A Christmas Carol on Christmas night) and then The Doctor, The Widow and The Wardrobe at 11:55pm on Boxing Day, only a little over three hours since it had first aired. This became the shortest gap between an episode's debut outing and its first repeat by the network.

From January 2012 ABC2 commenced a full repeat run of the entire revived series of Doctor Who, stripped Monday-Friday at 7:30pm, from Rose on 2 January all the way through to The Doctor, The Widow and The Wardrobe on 12 September. The run was interrupted for seven days between 30 August and 7 September for ABC2's broadcast of the 2012 London Paralympics. Later in 2012 the gap between UK and Australian broadcasts was reduced to the shortest it had ever been. From Sunday 2 September 2012 first run episodes from the first part of Series 7 were made available via the ABC's iView platform from 5:10am AEST – literally within minutes of them having finished in the UK. Starting with The Beast Below, the same episodes were broadcast at 7:30pm the following Saturday, followed by an ABC2 encore at 9:30pm the following Tuesday. Over the 201213 summer non-ratings period, ABC1 added a handful of Doctor Who episodes to its 6pm Friday slot for repeating – The Waters of Mars, one Doctor Who's Greatest Moments special and the first three episodes of Series 7b. At Christmas 2012, The Snowmen was available on ABC iView by 5:30am on Boxing Day, before being broadcast at 7:30pm Boxing Day on ABC1, followed by an ABC2 encore at 9:30pm on New Year's night.

On 31 March 2013 the second part of Series 7 returned to 7:30pm Sundays on ABC1, again only about half a day after each episode ended on BBC One. Immediately afterwards, each episode became available on iView for one week, with an ABC2 encore broadcast at 8:30 the following (Monday) night. Later in the year, ABC1 took a live simulcast from the BBC to screen Doctor Who Live: The Next Doctor, the half-hour special in which the actor chosen to play the Twelfth Doctor was revealed before a live studio audience, on Monday 5 August at 4am. The special was replayed on ABC2 at 8:30pm on that same day.

Purposefully timed as part of the ABC's recognition of Doctor Who's 50th Anniversary celebrations, from 1 July ABC2 again repeated the revived series Monday-Friday at ~7:35pm. Starting with the three 2009 Doctor Who's Greatest Moments specials made by the Doctor Who Confidential team, they then went back to Series 1 and Rose and continued all the way through to The Name of the Doctor on Friday 22 November. On the morning of Sunday 24 November ABC1 was one of multiple broadcasters in 94 countries to take a live simulcast of the Doctor Who 50th Anniversary Special The Day of the Doctor from the BBC. The live simulcast went out across Australia at local times ranging from 3:50am to 6:50am. From 8:30am the episode was available via iView and was subsequently broadcast in prime-time at 7:30pm that night, then replayed on ABC2 at 7:30 the following night. There was also a limited run of 3D cinema screenings of The Day of the Doctor around the country. ABC1 paired The Day of the Doctor with An Adventure in Space and Time, the feature-length drama that recreated Doctor Who's formative years. It had its ABC1 premiere at 8:50pm, immediately following The Name of The Doctor, as well as an encore screening at 1pm the following day. At Christmas, the Doctor Who Christmas Special was again scheduled into ABC1's 7:30pm Boxing Day timeslot, with The Time of the Doctor being Matt Smith's final first-run episode to premiere in Australia.

On 26 October 2022 the ABC announced that Jodie Whittaker's final episode, The Power of the Doctor, would be the last first-run episode of Doctor Who to be broadcast on the ABC, with the series moving to Disney+ from 2023 onwards.

Unlike the classic series, which saw innumerable instances of censorship, both societal changes as well as changes to the television ratings classification system itself have meant that networks have been more free to show material that may not have been allowed to air at all in the 1960s or 1970s. Aside from some early references to violence or horror that was toned down or removed altogether in post-production the new series has generally been free from censorship.

Non-ABC screenings
UK.TV, a pay TV channel in Australia, also broadcast the old series, and after the free to air screening on the ABC it showed Series 1 of the new episodes (which began on 7 October 2006). The Series 1 finale first aired on 17 December 2006. The versions shown by UKTV were edited, meaning portions of each episode were not shown. Starting 2007, the repeats of the new series 2 have been accompanied by cut-down version episodes of Doctor Who Confidential, reportedly the first time that a broadcaster has shown this programme outside of the UK.

SciFi Australia, another Australian pay TV channel, started screening all the Tom Baker stories from 17 August 2011.

Torchwood
Channel Ten has broadcast Davies' spin-off series, Torchwood, after both the ABC and SBS passed on buying the rights. The series premiered on 18 June 2007. Torchwood started to air every Monday at 9:30pm or 9:40pm – depending on the programme preceding it – for the first six episodes but was then moved to 12am Wednesday, apparently due to lower than anticipated ratings.Torchwood was bought by the ABC and series 1 and 2 were shown on ABC2 in 2009, on Fridays at 8.30 from 19 June, and followed by a cut version of Torchwood Declassified. Children of Earth was shown on Friday nights at 8:30 as well, however, only one episode was shown per week instead of the 'one per day over a week' format it was created for. Torchwood: Miracle Day (series four) has been bought by Eleven, a Network Ten digital only channel.

Lost episodes in Australia

Since some states differed in their school holiday dates, the ABC had no alternative but to have multiple copies of some of the early 16mm format episodes for different states. Hence it was hoped by fans in the 1990s that copies of episodes deemed lost by the BBC might yet be found in Australia, having been mis-shelved in the various state-based offices of the ABC. The agreement with the BBC required that all such episodes should be destroyed or returned, although it is known that some were souvenired by staff, since at least five ended up in the hand of a private collector, and three were seen by some Sydney fans in the 1970s. But despite these, and a few episodes turning up in the ABC in the 1990s, nothing new has since come to light (as of March 2009). The ABC archive went through a major review following the closure of the ABC's old Sydney studio headquarters at Gore Hill, and many "lost" film and video resources were rediscovered and the ABC has also begun the process of archiving old film and video materials in digital format (such as segments from the 1970s pop music series GTK). However, no new Doctor Who finds have been reported to date.

Censorship

All overseas imported films had to be checked and classified by the Australian censors, so all stories were viewed by them, prior to purchase by the ABC. At this point some Doctor Who episodes failed to obtain a clearance for a pre 7pm timeslot, so they were not purchased by the ABC (such as The Daleks' Master Plan). Although, a few stories, such as the first two Dalek stories, despite being classified "A" ("not suitable for children"), were run in the first batch in 1965 because the ABC had initially scheduled the series to run after the national 7 PM news, so these stories were allowed to be screened at 7.30 PM. But they could not be repeated, as the ABC subsequently shifted the series from this later slot to the more family oriented time of 6.30 PM. In addition, stories could be accepted by the censors, but only if certain scenes, or even brief shots, were deleted. The issue of an "A" classification again became a problem with the Jon Pertwee era and several stories were not screened as a result, e.g. The Ambassadors of Death, Inferno, The Dæmons, and The Mind of Evil). Only a few Tom Baker stories were thus rejected in full, such as The Deadly Assassin, and The Brain of Morbius. All were later re-classified and screened in the 1980s when the decision on these issues was decentralised down to the ABC, which passed these items. Some broadcast delays being due to poor quality videotapes (sourced from countries with differing video format, such as the USA), or to episode availability in black and white only (having originally been filmed in colour). In many cases some of the cuts now seem utterly inconsequential, but they stand as a testament to changing community values over the decades.

In 1996, about 25 minutes worth of some very short censored black and white 16mm film clips were recovered from the National Archive vaults, snipped by the censor from a variety of 1960s episodes, these cut portions of 16mm film had not been in the hands of the ABC, and had been impounded by the Australian censors.

Merchandise
Apart from imports of products from overseas, there have been a number of commercial products licensed to be made especially for the Australian market.  Over the decades, the national broadcaster, the ABC, has produced a variety of items and promoted them vigorously on-air and in its shops.  Several have basically been reprints of British products with the ABC logo on the covers replacing a British one, such as an Australian edition of what in Britain had been the "Doctor Who 20th Anniversary Special" (in 1983).  There was also a "Technical Manual" with supposed plans of Daleks, robots, the TARDIS, guns, K9 and sundry aliens.

In 1980, sets of Tom Baker merchandise which included posters, cards, buttons, and writing sets, was also largely a reissue of British product, marketed in Australia from Sydney by an Ian Nichols who had moved from Britain to handle the items. These were vigorously promoted in Sydney by "Grace Brothers" (nothing to do with the BBC comedy series "Are You Being Served?") a chain of department stores, which brought Tom Baker out to conduct a whirlwind autographing blitz in its many suburban stores. But after that these items were not very successful.

Other stray items have been "Show Bags" full of ephemeral bits and pieces, usually of a fairly poor quality for children, and sold at major "shows" (usually related to rural production with fun fairs and other activities) such as the "Royal Easter Show" in Sydney where the stall holder also distributed some leaflets to promote the national club, and he had plans to tour many rural towns throughout the state of New South Wales, and maybe to go further afield. A similar (or even identical) product was sold at the Royal Melbourne Show.

The distributor of BBC DVDs Roadshow has for several years issued the BBC product but for Australian format, and often with the address of the Australian club on the wrapping.

Fandom

Pre-history
There may have been some isolated Australian branches of Keith Miller's British Doctor Who club, and there was at least one small suburban club-ette in Sydney around 1974 (recalled by Kerrie Dougherty), as well as occasional signs of fan activity here and there (e.g. a fan organised film screening in Sydney of Daleks - Invasion Earth 2150 AD in 1975, and an issue of a Tolkien fanzine devoted to Doctor Who, issued as "Macra" in late 1975. But before 1976 there was no solid fan organisation. The last three of these strands came together at Sydney University in 1975–76, which led to the formation of a national club in August 1976.  Members of the Sydney University Science Fiction Association ("SUSFA"), decided to build a Dalek to enter in a planned Dalek race to be held over Easter 1976 year to race other Daleks at a University Science Fiction Convention "Unicon 2" at Melbourne University over Easter (for photos of these Daleks and others, go to "External Links" below for the site "Daleksdownunder"). Although the Melbourne students had built their Dalek in 1975, and Adelaide students also built one, there is no evidence either group went on to form a Doctor Who club.  However, after winning this race the SUSFA members were fired up and organised screenings of both Dalek films, and arranged a number of other activities involving the Dalek around campus at Sydney University during 1976.

But why this led to a dedicated Doctor Who club at Sydney University and not elsewhere must remain a mystery.  Perhaps their Daleks were just student pranks, and not signs of dedicated fan obsession.  The change at Sydney into a Doctor Who fanclub with fanzine (Zerinza) requires an outline of some of the broadcasting context as it related to fans (in more detail above). By the mid-1970s the series was not rating well and the ABC used less and less new material every year, slowly getting well over a year behind the BBC's screenings in Britain, and missing several stories.  Fed up with such sporadic sequencing during 1974–77, a Sydney fan, Antony Howe, began to agitate to have the series shown in full, and soon after the premieres in Britain rather than being screened years later.  Other demands were to stop the censorship of whole stories (many had been rated "A" by the censor, limited to screening after 7.30 pm which the ABC refused to do), and to have more repeats.  Such criticisms were made public in the special "Dalek Soit" science fiction edition of the famous student newspaper Honi Soit which featured news and photographs of the club Dalek's conquest of the campus, and an appreciative quasi-academic article on the Doctor Who TV series, by local science fiction author Terry Dowling. Also flagged was the launch of a Doctor Who fanzine (see Zerinza) and addresses were given for overseas Doctor Who fan clubs, so a local club was not yet envisaged.

This rapidly changed, however, as petitions and letter writing campaigns got nowhere.  After being fobbed off again in mid-1976 by the ABC, Howe, by then the new President of the SUSFA, brought the matter up with the Uni. club for action.  SUSFA had several other active members who were keen Doctor Who fans, such as Kerrie Dougherty, Dallas Jones, and Jon Noble (who also published a roneoed Tolkien fanzine, South of Harad, East of Rhun, with material on the Daleks, etc., in some issues).  The SUSFA agreed that in the August vacation it would hold a protest at the ABC Head office in Elizabeth Street, Sydney, complete with the SUSFA's Dalek.  The "Demo" was to urge more screenings.

The 1976 Save Doctor Who campaign
During the vacation Antony Howe learned the ABC had actually decided to cease purchasing any new episodes of the series, and the planned "Dalek Demo" now had a more urgent goal – to "Save Doctor Who". Organised by Howe, SUSFA members and others, the "Dalek Demo" of 24 August 1976 helped create a small core of people who formed fandom in Sydney, then the rest of Australia, but only about 20 turned up at the peak, with a dozen people or so were present at other times.  Even ABC Programme Dept. staff said they knew nothing about the top level decision.  Management's decision was also widely revealed in the student newspaper and fans urged to begin a letter writing campaign, and to join the new Australasian Dr Who Fan Club, and attend a screening of the film Doctor Who and the Daleks where further details were announced. Thus was a longer term campaign to "Save Doctor Who" had been launched: complete with posters and leaflets; networking with existing Science Fiction enthusiasts around the country; a radio interview; and letter writing campaigns to the rest of the media, not just the ABC.  The "Demo" and other efforts are widely thought by fans and others to have encouraged the broadcaster to change its mind. Howe, however, has doubts that such a small "Demo," and club, had much effect on a huge bureaucracy like the ABC.  Eventually the ABC did buy the new series (season 2 and 3 of Tom Baker), Howe believes this was probably due to the high ratings in Britain, rather than to his own efforts.

The campaign did however, lead to a fan magazine and club.  Reporting on the "Demo" and associated activities, Howe formed a club, linked up with the UK club (DWAS), and launched his fanzine "Zerinza: the Australasian Doctor Who Fanzine" in August 1976 at a Sydney University screening of "Dr. Who and the Daleks" he had organised for SUSFA (on 21 Sept. 1976). His fanzine was only possible because the SUSFA had a printing machine for its own fanzine "Enigma."  Its editor-printer, Van Ikin kindly printed the first 3 years or so of "Zerinza" for Howe.  "Zerinza" was claimed to be a Dalek word for "Good Success" in a Dalek Annual of the 1960s.  The 'zine was available at fan events and some specialist shops ("Galaxy" in Sydney, and "Space Age" in Melbourne), but it was mainly sold through the post, appearing with some (more or less) regularity every year with the last routine issue #35 in mid-1984.

The associated club was announced in the first issue, but held no public or regular meetings until November 1979 as it so completely overlapped with the SUSFA in membership that there was no point in holding separate activities until the students had mostly graduated and moved on.  Initially all "Zerinza" subscribers were notionally members of the "Australasian Doctor Who Fan Club" run by Antony Howe with the help of his mother who did much of the typing, and articles by other members of SUSFA and increasingly outside people who networked as part of the ongoing protest over the ABC policy toward the series. The broadcaster abruptly changed its mind with a new Controller of TV and from 1978 the series was to be screened with great regularity.

The Doctor Who Club of Australia
Initially called The Australasian Doctor Who Fan Club, this, the nationwide club, is also the oldest and largest Doctor Who club in Australia, formed in 1976, but initially closely entwined with the SUSFA (see above).

By 1979, with the visit of Tom Baker to promote the series for the ABC, Doctor Who fandom was increasingly separate from SUSFA and other university based clubs around the country.  The visit by Baker also stimulated a greater level of fan activity in Melbourne and Brisbane with clubs forming there as well.  After Antony Howe resigned as President of SUSFA in 1980, he remained with the ADWFC organising a series of events, the fanzine, and a mail order business of imported Doctor Who merchandise, often unavailable in dozens of tiny rural towns outside the main cities.

The ADWFC's most successful event to then was in mid-1980, when Jon Pertwee toured Sydney for cabaret shows, and kindly attended a half-day "Dr Who Party."  Having its founders and core workers resident in Sydney, with the ABC head office there as well, the club administration has thus been based in the state of New South Wales, and therefore runs the main club events in Sydney.

These headquarters in Sydney and heavy focus on Sydney-based events led Doctor Who'' fan leadership elsewhere in Australia, particularly in Melbourne, to insultingly refer to the DWCA as "the Sydney club".

From 1979, there were "parties" held multiple times most years, but conventions were seen as too expensive to risk until 1988's "Console 88" event, featuring Katy Manning, Mark Strickson, Julie Brennan and other guests who could be sourced locally, then in 1990, when Nicholas Courtney best known for his role as the Brigadier was flown out to be the main guest at the first "Whovention".

Howe had issued a few one-off newsletters to announce the Baker and Pertwee visits, and as the fanzine was often months late, Dallas Jones offered to produce a more regular newsletter, and Howe agreed, helping with typing, proof reading, and printing it using the SUSFA printing machine, thus the future "Data Extract" was launched.  When Antony Howe resigned from the Presidency of the ADWFC in 1984, and ceased regular publication of Zerinza, he was succeeded by Dallas Jones, who also edited a few special issues of Zerinza. Other presidents include Kate Orman, Neil Hogan, Todd Beilby, James Sellwood, Karen Carpenter and Lauren Davis. The current president is Jon Anderson.

Over the years, as the national club, the DWCA had several name shifts, and a changing number of regional chapters around the country, and a few of these are part of the state based clubs listed below.  The club still publishes the regular club magazine "Data Extract" which has had an unbroken run of publication since 1980. The club continues to offer a large range of merchandise for sale through the club's merchandise store at the club's website.

Other clubs and groups
The Supreme Council of Time Lords introduced the first Australian and New Zealand fan award system, the Double Gammas, open to all Australia and New Zealand Doctor Who fanzines, fan writers, fan artists, with fans members of any Australian or New Zealand Doctor Who club or readers of any Australian or New Zealand Doctor Who fanzine or newsletter, able to nominate and vote. These awards were first presented in 1984 at "Who Do 84", during the Time Lord Ball.

Australia also has a number of regional state-based clubs.The Queensland Doctor Who Fan Club was formed in about 1978. It closed in late 1980, but other successor clubs almost immediately sprang up, usually affiliated to the national club, such as the Brisbane Doctor Who Fan Club (closed 2000).The South Australian Doctor Who Fan Club was formed on 1 June 1980 and incorporated on 7 September 1982. It held Conpanion, the first Australian Doctor Who convention, on 8 to 11 October 1983 with Katy Manning as Guest of Honour. On 18 November 2000 the club was rebranded as Science Fiction South Australia. It meets from 3pm to 10pm on the third Saturday of each month except December at Adelaide High School. Publications include the Doctor Who yearbook "Chameleon Factor", regular general SF magazine "SFSA" and the bi-monthly newsletter "The Wall of Lies".The Western Australian Doctor Who Club known legally as The West Lodge Inside The Blue Box Incorporated. was formed in July 1983 following a Myer signing by Peter Davison earlier that year. The club has been meeting on the first Saturday of the Month since then and is still running over 30 years later.League of Doctors was created in 2010 at Supanova Sydney. Their aim is to showcase all of the Doctor, past and present, including Peter Cushing from the Dr. Who (Dalek films) and David Tennant's left hand for all conventions across Australia. They also look to have accompanying assistants or companions for each Doctor. The current president of the League of Doctors is Jacob Moriarty who took over from Bron Mitchell and Sean C. Berry in 2012.The Doctor Who Club of Victoria''' (DWCV) was founded in 1979, based in Melbourne, and has had mixed relations with the Sydney-based DWCA over the years because of Melbourne and Sydney's long term rivalry.

Conventions
During the 1980s there had been many large scale fan events in various cities (see above), some rather grandly called "conventions," others by the less grand label "parties." There is a little information on the names and dates of a wide variety of conventions in the article on the Double Gammas, the Australian Doctor Who fan awards.

References

External links 
South Australian Doctor Who Fan Club, Inc. (branded as Science Fiction South Australia)
Doctor Who Club of Australia
Doctor Who Club of Victoria
The West Lodge Inside The Blue Box Inc, Western Australian Doctor Who Club
Torchwood Fan Club of Australia 
Daleks Down-Under
ABC Whovians- for Humanoids who watch Doctor Who on their ABC
Official Doctor Who 50th Anniversary Store Australia

Doctor Who fandom